The Hirvepark meeting was a political demonstration held in Hirvepark, Estonia on 23 August 1987, on the anniversary of the Molotov-Ribbentrop Pact. It was attended by an estimated 7,000 people, and was one of the first organized public demonstrations against the Estonian Communist Party. Participants demanded the public disclosure of the Molotov-Ribbentrop Pact and its secret protocols, along with the liquidation of the pact's consequences. The demonstration sparked a wave of anti-Soviet activity and mass protests in support of the restoration of Estonia's independence.

The MRP-AEG 
The leaders of the meeting were members of MRP-AEG, the Estonian Group on Publication of the Molotov-Ribbentrop Pact, an organisation dedicated to publishing the Molotov-Ribbentrop Pact and its secret additional protocols. These included Tiit Madisson, Heiki Ahonen, Lagle Parek, and Erik Udam. The general public was notified of the meeting through the Voice of America and Radio Free Europe, as well as orally.

MRP-AEG also used the event to distribute the MRP-AEG Bulletin, an underground self-printed bulletin that contained the organisation's statements and political opinions, reviews of demonstrations and pickets, authority-led actions and repressions, as well as thematic articles, historical reviews, and memoirs. Its self-publication meant only those who came to the publishers directly or through acquaintances could obtain the bulletin.

Events of the meeting 
Initially, the demonstration was supposed to take place at the Town Hall Square, but the city government issued a last-minute revocation of their permission given for the meeting. At the militia's request, the attendees moved on to Harjumäe, chanting slogans such as "publicise the Molotov-Ribbentrop conditions", "[the right of] self-determination for Baltic countries", "abolish the Molotov-Ribbentrop agreement", "Bring Stalinist executioners to justice", and "free Enn Tarto and Mart Niklus". 
A suitable place for the meeting was found on the steps of Hirvepark. In the demonstration's opening speech, the principal organiser, Tiit Madisson, spoke about the non-aggression pact signed between Germany and the Soviet Union almost 50 years ago, and its secretive additional protocols, which divided Eastern Europe into spheres of influence. Gorbachev's implementation of glasnost meant the number of Estonian human casualties caused by the pact's implementation had been publicised for the very first time, and the question of the restoration of Estonia's independence was raised.

Speakers included Heiki Ahonen, Erik Udam, Villu Rooda, Lagle Parek, Jüri Mikk, Roman Bode, and Kalju Mätik. There were also poetry readings from Merle Jääger and Raivo Raave, as well as one Platon Afanasjev, who claimed to be a functionary of Communist International; however, audience members deemed him to be too young to be part of the organisation, and he was consequently heckled off-stage. The crowd of now-several thousand participants sang 'Our currents are free' (also known as 'Jää vabaks, Eesti meri'), and over a hundred people followed Lagle Parek's plea to enroll in an organisation dedicated to remembering victims of Stalinism.

Media coverage 
Coverage from Estonian SSR media platforms was immediate and critical. The demonstration was referred to as foreign interference in the USSR's internal affairs, and the forging of fascists - in newspapers, tabloid-esque articles appeared, in which Madisson, Parek and Mikku were depicted as simple 'thieves', 'crooks', and provocateurs that were distorting history. Due to their participation in the meeting, many MPR initiators were subjected to consequences and repressions by the KGB. Following Hirvepark, Tiit Madisson was forced to emigrate to Sweden.

Outcomes 
Ultimately, the demonstration gathered a crowd of around 7,000 participants, that neither the authorities nor the organisers could have expected. For almost half a century, all political initiatives in Estonia had been under the complete control of the Communist Party. The Hirvepark meeting was the first major public-initiated demonstration in which, under the conditions of perestroika and glasnost, authorities could not intervene in.

The Communist Party and KGB faced uncertainty and confusion in the new situation; between the Chernobyl disaster, Soviet-Afghan War, and Phosphorite War, glasnost had backfired in giving Estonians free speech, and effectively, the legal ability to dissent for the first time since USSR occupation. Independence and the Republic of Estonia's restoration were not directly demanded at the Hirvepark demonstration, but the organisers had hit a crucial point in their occupation - the disclosure of the Molotov-Ribbentrop Pact and its secret protocols meant the USSR would have to expose a historical lie, and demonstrate the illegitimacy of the Soviet Union. The Hirvepark meeting established legal emphasis, that prepared the restoration of the Republic of Estonia on the basis of legal continuity on August 20, 1991.

References

History of Tallinn
1987 in Estonia
1987 in the Soviet Union
1987 protests
August 1987 events in Europe
Protests in the Soviet Union
Protests in Estonia